In Italian, crudo  means "raw". In Italian cuisine, this word can be used with a lot of food: pesce crudo means "raw fish", and carne cruda means "raw meat", similar to steak tartare.

See also
 Kinilaw
 Ceviche
 Salsiccia cruda
 Poke (Hawaii)
 Sashimi

References

Italian cuisine
Uncooked fish dishes
Potentially dangerous food